Craig Frawley (born 19 August 1980) is an Australian former professional rugby league footballer who played in the 2000s.

Background
While attending Southern Cross Catholic, Frawley played for the Australian Schoolboys team in 1997.

Playing career
Frawley made his first grade debut for Brisbane against the Sydney Roosters in round 6 of the 2003 NRL season at the Sydney Football Stadium.  He played in the club's qualifying final defeat against Penrith in the same year.

In the 2004 NRL season, he played 15 games and scored 10 tries for Brisbane.  He was then released by the club and joined the Canberra Raiders.  

Frawley's time at Canberra was marred by several minor injuries, and he was eventually released by the club in April 2007. 

After being re-signed by the Brisbane Broncos and playing with their Queensland Cup feeder side Aspley, Frawley was called up to the first grade team after an injury to Brent Tate. He had a strong opening to the season, but due to a hamstring injury was unable to continue to compete at NRL level.  His final game for Brisbane was their round 23 loss against Canterbury-Bankstown at Suncorp Stadium during the 2007 NRL season.

References

External links
 

1980 births
Living people
Australian rugby league players
Brisbane Broncos players
Canberra Raiders players
Rugby league centres
Rugby league players from Brisbane
Rugby league second-rows
Rugby league wingers